Consort Xiao, Pure Consort Xiao or Xiao shufei (蕭淑妃, personal name unknown) (died after 16 November-3 December 655), was a concubine of Emperor Gaozong of Tang (Li Zhi). She was initially favored by him and bore him a son and two daughters—Li Sujie and the Princesses Yiyang and Gao'an—but later, after her romantic rival Empress Wang introduced another concubine, Consort Wu (later known as Wu Zetian), to Emperor Gaozong, Emperor Gaozong became enamored with Consort Wu.  Empress Wang and Consort Xiao instead joined forces to try to counter Consort Wu, but in 655, Emperor Gaozong deposed both of them on accusations of witchcraft and replaced Empress Wang with Consort Wu.  Soon, they were executed on the new Empress Wu's orders.

Background 
Little is known about Consort Xiao's background.  What is known is that she was already a concubine of Li Zhi when he was crown prince under his father Emperor Taizong, as her son Li Sujie was born in 645, before his ascension in 649.  While she was a concubine to the crown prince, she carried the title of Liangdi (良娣).  In addition to Li Sujie, she bore two daughters, who were probably older than Li Sujie.  It was also said that she was favored by him, more so than his wife Crown Princess Wang.

As imperial consort 
In 649, after Emperor Taizong died, Li Zhi took the throne (as Emperor Gaozong).  He created Crown Princess Wang empress, and he created Consort Xiao the rank of Shufei, the second highest rank for imperial concubines.  She continued to be favored, which drew jealousy from Empress Wang, and Empress Wang's jealousy soon caused both of them to face a different romantic rival.

When Emperor Gaozong was crown prince, he had been attracted by the beauty of one of Emperor Taizong's concubines, Consort Wu.  After Emperor Taizong's death, all of his concubines who did not bear sons were housed at Ganye Temple (感業寺) to be Buddhist nuns.  In either 650 or 651, when Emperor Gaozong was visiting Ganye Temple to offer incense to Buddha, when he saw Consort Wu.  Both of them wept.  When Empress Wang heard this, she, wanting to divert Emperor Gaozong's favor from Consort Xiao, secretly instructed Consort Wu to grow her hair back, while suggesting to Emperor Gaozong that he take her as a concubine.  Consort Wu was intelligent and full of machinations, and therefore, when she first returned to the palace, she acted humbly and flattered Empress Wang, who trusted her greatly and recommended her to Emperor Gaozong.  Soon, Emperor Gaozong became enamored with Consort Wu.  Both Empress Wang and Consort Xiao lost favor, and soon, they realized the seriousness of the situation and joined forces to try to alienate Consort Wu from Emperor Gaozong, but were unsuccessful.

In 654, Consort Wu framed Empress Wang for the death of her daughter, and in 655 further accused Empress Wang and her mother Lady Liu of using witchcraft.  Emperor Gaozong deposed both Empress Wang and Consort Xiao, reducing them to commoner rank and imprisoning them inside the palace.

Death and aftermath 
Six days after Empress Wang's removal, Consort Wu was created empress. By order of the new Empress Wu, Empress Wang and Consort Xiao were put under arrest inside the palace, at a building that had its doors and windows tightly sealed, with only a hole on the wall to deliver food. One day, after the coronation of Empress Wu, Emperor Gaozong thought of them and decided to visit them; when he saw the conditions they were in, he was saddened, calling out, "Empress, Shufei, where are you?"  Empress Wang wept and responded, "We have been found guilty and reduced to be maidservants. How can we still be referred to by honored titles?"  She also begged, "If Your Imperial Majesty considered our past relationships and will allow us to again see the light of day, please rename this place 'Huixin Courtyard' [(回心院, meaning "the courtyard of Repentance")]."  Emperor Gaozong was initially receptive, responding, "I will do so right away." However, when Empress Wu heard this, she was enraged and issued their death warrants and sent people to cane Empress Wang and Consort Xiao 100 times each and cut off their hands and feet. She then had them put into large wine jars, saying, "Let these two witches be drunk to their bones!"  When Empress Wang was informed of the orders, she bowed and stated, "May His Imperial Majesty live forever, and may Zhaoyi [(昭儀, Empress Wu's title as a concubine, implicitly refusing to acknowledge her as empress)] be favored forever. Dying is within my responsibility."  However, Consort Xiao cursed Empress Wu by saying, "Wu is a treacherous monster!  I will be reincarnated as a cat and she would be reincarnated as a mouse so that I could grab her throat forever and ever!" Empress Wang and Consort Xiao suffered for several days inside the wine jars before dying, and Empress Wu had their bodies taken out of the wine jars and beheaded. (When Empress Wu heard of Consort Xiao's curse, she forbade the palace personnel from keeping cats as pets, and even ordered the banning of cats as pets in the capital, Chang'an, but thereafter often dreamed of Empress Wang and Consort Xiao, with scattered hair and bleeding limbs, seeking to kill her. She thereafter initially moved to Penglai Palace (蓬萊宮), but continued to dream of them, and therefore eventually spent most of her time in the eastern capital Luoyang and not in the capital Chang'an, where these events occurred.)  Soon after Empress Wang's and Consort Xiao's deaths, at Empress Wu's urging, Emperor Gaozong also had Empress Wang's and her clan's surname changed from Wang (王, a typical surname meaning "king" or "monarch") to Mang (蟒, meaning "python") and Consort Xiao's and her clan's surname changed from Xiao (萧, another typical surname meaning "sad" or "calm") to Xiao (梟, meaning "owl").  Only after Empress Wu's own death in 705 were their clans' proper surnames restored.

On the orders of Empress Wu, both of Consort Xiao's daughters, who by now carried the titles of Princess Yiyang and Princess Gao'an, were put under house arrest inside the palace, and were not allowed to marry. Not until Empress Wu's oldest son, the crown prince Li Hong interceded, probably in 671, were they allowed to marry—and even then, Empress Wu simply found two imperial guards, Quan Yi (權毅) (for Princess Yiyang) and Wang Xu (王勗) (for Princess Gao'an) to marry them immediately.  Meanwhile, Li Sujie was allowed to be an imperial prince but continuously drew Empress Wu's hatred, causing him to be demoted and put under close watch a number of times. This situation was exacerbated by the unstoppable rise of Empress Wu's influence and power over the throne, especially as Emperor Gaozong's illness grew, and he in 690, was eventually killed on the orders of Empress Wu (who by then was empress dowager and regent) during the Tianshou era of her reign.

Modern depictions 

 Portrayed by Chan Choi Yin in the 1984 Hong-Kong TV series Empress Wu.
 Portrayed by Kung Lien Hua in the 1985 Taiwanese TV series The Empress of the Dynasty.
 Portrayed by Yu Hui  in the 1995 Chinese TV series Wu Zetian.
 Portrayed by Jessie Chang in the 2003 Chinese TV series Lady Wu: The First Empress.
 Portrayed by Xie Jin Tian in the 2006 Chinese TV series Wu Zi Bei Ge.
 Portrayed by Ban Min-jung in 2006-2007 SBS TV series Yeon Gaesomun.
 Portrayed by Li Na in the 2011 TV series Secret History of Empress Wu.
 Portrayed by Sui Jun Bo in the 2011 Chinese TV series Meng Hui Tang Chao.
 Portrayed by Cao Xiwen in the 2011 Chinese TV series Beauty World.
 Portrayed by Zhang Xinyu in the 2014 Chinese TV series The Empress of China.
 Portrayed by Li Wen Wen (though her character is renamed "Consort Xu) in the 2014 Chinese TV series Young Sherlock.
 Portrayed by Liu Hai Lan in the 2017 Chinese TV series Legendary Di Renjie.

Notes and references 

 Old Book of Tang, vol. 51 .
 New Book of Tang, vol. 76 .
 Zizhi Tongjian, vols. 199, 200.

Tang dynasty imperial consorts
7th-century births
655 deaths
Wu Zetian